
Gmina Wilczęta (german: Deutschendorf) is a rural gmina (administrative district) in Braniewo County, Warmian-Masurian Voivodeship, in northern Poland.

Villages
Gmina Wilczęta contains the villages and settlements of Bardyny, Bronki, Chmielówka, Dębień, Dębiny, Gładysze, Górski Las, Góry, Jankówko, Karpówek, Karwiny, Księżno, Ławki, Lipowa, Nowica, Słobity, Słobity-Stacja Kolejowa, Sopoty, Sośnica, Spędy, Stare Siedlisko, Tatarki and Wilczęta.

Neighbouring gminas
Gmina Wilczęta is bordered by the gminas of Godkowo, Młynary, Orneta, Pasłęk and Płoskinia.

References
Polish official population figures 2006

Wilczeta
Braniewo County